Pose space deformation is a computer animation technique which is used to deform a mesh on skeleton-driven animation. Common use of this technique is to deform the shape of a mesh (for example, an arm) according to the angle of the joint (in this case, the elbow) bent. Although the name is commonly called Pose space deformation on many scholarly articles, 3D animation software rarely uses that name. On Autodesk Maya, it's implemented under the name Pose Deformer, and on Blender, it's implemented as Corrective Shape Keys. The first famous application of this technique was the cloth's movement on the first episode of the animated film The Animatrix.

Fundamentally, pose space deformation (PSD) poses animation as an alternative class of interpolation. Rather than interpolate in time, as with animation curves, or over space, as with meshes, PSD views animation as interpolation over the domain of the character's pose.  PSD was an early use of machine learning and neural networks in computer graphics: the radial basis interpolation that is often used to implement PSD is equivalent to a neural network with a radial nonlinearity.

Articles
2000 Pose space deformation: a unified approach to shape interpolation and skeleton-driven deformation
 2009 Practical Experiences with Pose Space Deformation
2014 Skinning: Real-time Shape Deformation Part III: Example-based Shape Deformation

External links 
 A posedeformer plugin for Maya
 Procedural Muscle and Skin Simulation
 Animatrix Pose Space Deformations
 Commercial Lipservice plugin

References

Computer animation
Computer graphics
Animation techniques